Tim Hrynewich (born October 2, 1963) is a Canadian former professional ice hockey left winger. He played 55 NHL games for the Pittsburgh Penguins between 1982 and 1984.

Career statistics

Regular season and playoffs

References

External links
 

1963 births
Living people
Baltimore Skipjacks players
Canadian ice hockey left wingers
Flint Spirits players
Fort Wayne Komets players
Ice hockey people from Ontario
Milwaukee Admirals (IHL) players
Muskegon Lumberjacks players
People from Leamington, Ontario
Pittsburgh Penguins players
Pittsburgh Penguins draft picks
SaiPa players
Sudbury Wolves players
Toledo Goaldiggers players